The 2009 Bauer Watertechnology Cup was a professional tennis tournament played on indoor carpet courts. It was the thirteenth edition of the tournament which was part of the 2009 ATP Challenger Tour. It took place in Eckental, Germany between 2 and 8 November 2009.

ATP entrants

Seeds

 Rankings are as of October 26, 2009.

Other entrants
The following players received wildcards into the singles main draw:
  Peter Gojowczyk
  Kevin Krawietz
  Cedrik-Marcel Stebe
  Marcel Zimmermann

The following players received entry from the qualifying draw:
  Bastian Knittel
  Nils Langer
  Nikola Mektić
  Timo Nieminen (LL)
  Antal van der Duim

Champions

Singles

 Daniel Brands def.  Dustin Brown, 6–4, 6–4

Doubles

 Michael Kohlmann /  Alexander Peya def.  Philipp Marx /  Igor Zelenay, 6–4, 7–6(4)

External links
Official website
ITF Search 
2009 Draws

Bauer Watertechnology Cup
Challenger Eckental
Ecken